The German 500 was an automobile race sanctioned by CART held at EuroSpeedway Lausitz in Germany in 2001 and 2003.

Race History
The German 500 as put on the schedule for the 2001 CART season and it was the first CART race ever to be held in Europe. It was the beginning of a two-week European stretch for the series; the Rockingham 500 was held at Rockingham Motor Speedway in Corby, England one week later.

The September 11 attacks occurred Four days before the race, causing most major American sporting events scheduled on the same weekend as the German 500 to be postponed, including National Football League and Major League Baseball  games and a NASCAR Winston Cup Series race, the New Hampshire 300 at New Hampshire Motor Speedway. The Italian Grand Prix, a Formula One race, was held that weekend. According to Ronald Richards, the vice president of CART, the series decided to continue with the race prior to the cancellation of that week's NFL games, a decision followed by other American leagues. Richards acknowledged that "We wish we would have had the input regarding the NFL's decision prior to making our decision." In remembrance of the September 11 attacks' victims, and in a desire to avoid criticism for holding the German 500 so soon afterward, CART changed the race's name to the American Memorial. The series also held tributes on the day of the race, and made a $500,000 donation to the World Trade Center Relief Fund, matching the event's prize fund. The race was won by Kenny Bräck but was marred by a crash involving Alex Tagliani and Alex Zanardi.

In 2002, the German 500 was originally scheduled for September 21st but was cancelled after EuroSpeedway filed for insolvency. The race returned to EuroSpeedway the following year, as did Zanardi, who ran 13 laps to represent those that he never completed in 2001.

In 2003, the race returned and so did Alex Zanardi, who drove a specially adapted car prior to the race. Sébastien Bourdais won the race but CART dropped EuroSpeedway Lausitz after the 2003 CART season.

Race winners

References

Champ Car races